The following are the national records in track cycling in Iran, maintained by its national cycling federation, Cycling Federation of the Islamic Republic of Iran.

Men

Women

References

External links
Cycling Federation of the Islamic Republic of Iran

Iran
records
track cycling
track cycling